The U.S. Army Health Services Command was activated on 1 April 1973 as part of a reorganization of the Army Medical Department. It took control of almost all Army medical facilities in the continental US, including medical education.

Purpose
The Health Services Command answered directly to the Chief of Staff of the United States Army. This allowed the Office of the Surgeon General to focus more on staff and technical supervisory duties as the principal adviser to the Chief of Staff of the Army on health and medical matters. In 1994, the HSC and Office of The Surgeon General were merged again.

Commanders
Commanders of the Health Services Command were the following:

 Major General Spurgeon Neel, April 1973 – October 1977
 Major General Marshall E. McCabe October 1977 – April 1980
 Major General Raymond H. Bishop, Jr., April 1980 – July 1983
 Major General Floyd W. Baker, July 1983 – July 1986
 Major General Tracey E. Strevey, Jr., July 1986 – September 1988
 Major General John E. Major, September 1988 0 28 December 1990
 Major General Alcide M. Lanoue, December 1990 – August 1992
 Brigadier General John J. Cuddy, August 1992 – October 1992
 Major General Richard D. Cameron, November 1992 – October 1994

References

Medical Commands of the United States Army
Military units and formations established in 1973
Military units and formations disestablished in 1994